is a live-action Japanese television drama about Maya Akutsu (Yūki Amami), a new teacher at Hanzaki Elementary School who strives for perfection and punishes her students in unorthodox manners. A 12-year-old student, Kazumi Kanda (Mirai Shida), has been able to withstand her strange punishments so far but the other 23 students begin to fold under the pressure.

In the last episode, it recorded the highest viewership rating of 25.3% in Kantō region. On March 17 and 18, 2006, two special prequel episodes were aired, and it recorded the highest rating of 21.2%.

A South Korean remake of the same title starring Go Hyun-jung in the lead role, was produced in 2013.

Cast
 Yūki Amami as Maya Akutsu
 Mirai Shida as Kazumi Kanda
 Naruki Matsukawa as Yūsuke Manabe
 Mayuko Fukuda as Hikaru Shindō
Hikari Kajiwara as Erika Sato
 Kaho as Yū Kanda
 Shigeru Izumiya as a headmaster

References

External links
  
 

Japanese drama television series
2005 Japanese television series debuts
2005 Japanese television series endings
Nippon TV dramas
Television shows written by Kazuhiko Yukawa